Ytre Oppedal is a village and ferry terminal in Gulen Municipality in Vestland county, Norway. It lies on the shores of the Oppedalsvika inlet along the south side of the Sognefjorden, east of where the Risnefjorden empties into the Sognefjorden.  The village lies on both sides of the river Oppedalselva, which flows directly to the ferry port.  The village of Brekke lies west of Ytre Oppedal, on the opposite side of the Risnefjorden.

The European route E39 highway runs north to Ytre Oppedal to the ferry quay at Ytre Oppdal where the highway crosses the Sognefjorden via MV Ampere ferry route to the village of Lavik in Høyanger Municipality where it continues to the north.  The Norwegian County Road 8 (Fv8) runs from Ytre Oppedal to the east to the neighboring village of Indre Oppedal and then it keeps going east into Høyanger Municipality.

References

Villages in Vestland
Gulen